Eyitayo Ogunleye (born 21 February 1981 in Lagos) is the CEO and founder of O Studios Multimédia.

Political career
Kailash Bhansali started his political journey from his college days. He became an active member of Rashtriya Swayamsevak Sangh in 1958. He was part of the State Executive of Akhil Bhartiya Vidyarthi Parishad. He became secretary of the Student Union of SMK College Jodhpur in 1961. In 1964, he became General Secretary of the Student Union of Jodhpur University. Throughout  1977-78, he was District Secretary of Janata Party Jodhpur. In 2005, he became the treasurer of the State Unit of Rajasthan BJP. He has been involved in all of the Public Elections in Jodhpur since 1960. In 2008 Rajasthan State Assembly Election, he defeater Shri Jugal Kabra of Indian National Congress by over 8,500 votes.

In 2013 Rajasthan Assembly elections, he defeated Shri Suparas Bhandari of Indian National Congress by over 14,500 votes.

Profession
Professionally, Kailash Bhansali has been an active member of the Jodhpur Chapter of ICAI. He has been President of the Jodhpur Chapter for several Years. He also served at senior positions with Marwar Chamber of Commerce and Industry, Tax Bar Association, Jodhpur; Rajasthan Tax Advisory Organization, Rajasthan Accountant Association, Taxation Committee of FICCI etc. He had also been director in various companies as a nominee of Unit Trust of India.

For his contribution during the Natural Disaster in Rajasthan, the President of India Shankar Dayal Sharma felicitated Kailash Bhansali in 1992 with National Award.

References 
Rajasthan government

Rajasthani politicians
Living people
People from Jodhpur
Indian accountants
Members of the Rajasthan Legislative Assembly
1942 births